Matthew "Matt" Powledge (born March 31, 1987) is an American football coach and former player who is currently the defensive coordinator for Baylor University. He previously served as the co-defensive coordinator for Oregon in 2022.

Powledge played college football at Sam Houston State University as a fullback from 2005 to 2009. Prior to his tenure at Oregon, he held various assistant coaching positions at Southeastern Louisiana University, Northwestern State University, the University of Kentucky, Sam Houston State University, the University of Louisiana–Monroe and Baylor University.

Early life and education
A native of Huntsville, Texas, Powledge played fullback at Sam Houston State University from 2005 to 2009 and was an all-Southland honoree as a junior and a team captain as a senior. Powledge earned his bachelor's degree at Sam Houston State University in kinesiology in 2009 and his master's degree in sports management at Southeastern Louisiana University in 2011.

Coaching career
In 2010, Powledge began his coaching career as a graduate assistant at Southeastern Louisiana University under head coach Mike Lucas. In 2011, Powledge was promoted to tight ends coach.

In 2012, Powledge was hired by Northwestern State University as their running backs coach.

In 2013, Powledge joined the University of Kentucky as a graduate assistant under head coach Mark Stoops.

In 2014, Powledge returned to his alma mater Sam Houston State University as their special teams coordinator and running backs coach.

In 2016, Powledge joined the University of Louisiana–Monroe (ULM) as their special teams coordinator and tight ends coach.

In 2018, Powledge was hired as the special teams coordinator and outside linebackers coach at the University of Louisiana at Lafayette under head coach Billy Napier.

On February 11, 2020, Powledge joined Baylor University as their special teams coordinator and safeties coach under head coach Dave Aranda.

On December 17, 2021, Powledge was hired as the co-defensive coordinator at the University of Oregon under head coach Dan Lanning.

On December 29, 2022, Powledge was hired as the defensive coordinator at the University of Baylor.

References

External links
 Baylor profile
 Louisiana profile
 Sam Houston State profile
 Northwestern State profile

1987 births
Living people
American football fullbacks
Baylor Bears football coaches
Kentucky Wildcats football coaches
Louisiana Ragin' Cajuns football coaches
Louisiana–Monroe Warhawks football coaches
Northwestern State Demons football coaches
Oregon Ducks football coaches
Sam Houston Bearkats football coaches
Sam Houston Bearkats football players
Southeastern Louisiana Lions football coaches
People from Huntsville, Texas
Coaches of American football from Texas
Players of American football from Texas